The  is a railway line in Shizuoka Prefecture, between Shin-Shizuoka in Aoi Ward and Shin-Shimizu in Shimizu Ward, all within the city of Shizuoka. This is the only line operated by the private railway operator Shizuoka Railway (Shizutetsu).

Services
The line has a fairly frequent service, with local services operating every 5-6 minutes during rush hours, and every 6-8 minutes during the daytime and at weekends, linking Shin-Shizuoka and Shin-Shimizu in 22 minutes. In addition, express services run in the mornings every 12 minutes, linking the two stations in 16-18 minutes.  All the train sets are formed of two cars, and are driver-only operated. All the stations accept LuLuCa, a smart card ticketing system. They accept PiTaPa and ICOCA as well.

Stations 
● indicate that the service will stop at that station, ↑ ↓ indicate that it will pass the station.

Rolling stock
 1000 series EMUs
 A3000 series two-car EMUs (since 24 March 2016)

The first of a new fleet of A3000 series two-car electric multiple unit (EMU) trains entered service on 24 March 2016.

History
The line was double-tracked in sections between 1925 and 1930 except the section to the wharf, which closed in 1945.

CTC signalling was commissioned in 1979.

See also
Nihondaira Ropeway
List of railway lines in Japan

References
This article incorporates material from the corresponding article in the Japanese Wikipedia.

External links 
  

Railway lines in Japan
Rail transport in Shizuoka Prefecture
Transport in Shizuoka (city)
Railway lines opened in 1908
1067 mm gauge railways in Japan
1908 establishments in Japan
600 V DC railway electrification